Joanna P. Adler (born 1964) is an American actress, known for her roles in Off-Broadway plays. She won an Obie Award in 1995. In 2014, Adler starred in the second season of the Lifetime television series Devious Maids.

Life and career
Adler graduated from Williams College in Williamstown, Massachusetts and pursued a master's degree in Performance Studies at New York University's Tisch School of the Arts. Before completing her thesis, she began her professional acting career working with the internationally renowned theater collaborative, Mabou Mines. She continued to work in New York City's off-Broadway theater community, most notably in the title role of Richard Foreman's Obie Award-winning play Benita Canova, John Guare's Lydie Breeze, and Paul Rudnick's The Most Fabulous Story Every Told. She has also appeared in a number of television commercials and in several independent movies. In 1995, Adler won an Obie Award for Distinguished Performance by an Actress, for her role in the off-Broadway play The Boys in the Basement. She made her Broadway debut in Terrence McNally's Deuce, directed by Michael Blakemore. On television, Adler has guest-starred in Sex and the City, Law & Order, Law & Order: Special Victims Unit, 30 Rock, The Good Wife, and The Blacklist, and has had recurring roles on Gravity, Are We There Yet?, Orange Is The New Black, Divorce, and The Sinner.

In December 2013, it was announced that Adler had been cast as a series regular for the second season of the Lifetime television comedy-drama series Devious Maids. She played the role of Opal, a new maid who is secretive and conniving, reminiscent of Mrs. Danvers from Hitchcock's Rebecca (1940).

In 2018, she appeared in FX's The Assassination of Gianni Versace: American Crime Story in a recurring role as Mary Ann Schillaci Cunanan, mother of serial killer Andrew Cunanan, who was portrayed by Darren Criss.

Filmography

Film

Television

References

External links

Obie Award recipients
American film actresses
American television actresses
American stage actresses
Living people
Place of birth missing (living people)
Williams College alumni
Tisch School of the Arts alumni
20th-century American actresses
21st-century American actresses
1964 births